= Sleepless Beauty =

- Directed by: Pavel Khvaleev
- Written by: Aleksandra Khvaleeva
- Produced by: Frank Ellrich; Elena Talyanskaya; Georgiy Smirnov
- Starring: Polina Davydova
- Cinematography: Pavel Khvaleev
- Edited by: Pavel Khvaleev
- Music by: Erase Me
- Production company: Monomania Films
- Release date: 29 June 2020
- Running time: 84 minutes
- Country: Russia
- Language: Russian

Sleepless Beauty (Я не сплю) is a 2020 Russian horror film directed by Pavel Khvaleev, starring Polina Davydova.

== Cast ==
- Polina Davydova as Mila
- Olivia Indik
- Evgeniy Gagarin as Man in Black
- Sergey Topkov as Mila's Dad
- Aleksandr Zilberkant as Ambassador
- Sergey Shegolsky as Surgeon

== Plot ==
After a failed assassination attempt on a foreign ambassador, a young schoolteacher named Mila is abducted and taken to an isolated industrial facility operated by a mysterious organization known as "Recreation". Her captors communicate with her through a loudspeaker while a masked enforcer ensures her compliance. Mila is subjected to strict rules, chief among them that she is forbidden from sleeping. Unknown to her initially, her captivity is secretly broadcast over an online livestream for anonymous viewers.

Over a period of several days, Recreation subjects Mila to increasing levels of physical and psychological torture designed to break down her resistance. She is forced to exercise, exposed to disturbing virtual-reality imagery, and subjected to traumatic experiences, including witnessing a woman's murder and being forced to kill rats in a coffin-like confined space. As her father reports her disappearance and attempts to locate her, the organization escalates the conditioning, culminating in brain surgery performed while Mila is conscious that damages her ability to recognize faces.

Once the conditioning is complete, Mila's captors release her. Her father is lured to her location via a message from her stolen phone. Mila fails to recognize her father and stabs him to death.

Recreation deems the experiment a success. It is revealed that Mila was not the intended assassin, but rather a randomly selected test subject used to prove that a combination of sleep deprivation, sensory manipulation, and neurological intervention could condition an ordinary person to kill someone close to them. Having demonstrated that the method works, the organization abducts the ambassador's estranged wife to condition her to assassinate her husband.

== Reception ==
Tori Danielle of PopHorror wrote, "Everything worked together perfectly creating something unique and special."

Ard Vijn of ScreenAnarchy wrote that the film is "well-made torture horror, but not much else besides."

Simon Abrams of RogerEbert.com rated the film 1 star out of 4 and called the film a "nasty endurance test, the sort of calling card genre exercise whose relentless extremity—both in terms of its explicit and psychological violence—often seems to be a goal unto itself."
